Tullia driving her Chariot over her Father is a 1687 painting by Giuseppe Bartolomeo Chiari which depicts the last Queen of Rome Tullia driving her chariot over the dead body of her father, King Servius Tullius. The work was commissioned by Jacopo Montinioni and was later purchased by John Cecil, 5th Earl of Exeter after the formers death. It is held today by the Burghley House Historic Trust.

See also
 Tullia Drives over the Corpse of her Father, by Jean Bardin
 Tullia Running Her Chariot over the Body of Her Father, by Michel-François Dandré-Bardon
 Tullia Driving her Chariot over the Body of her Father by François-Guillaume Ménageot

References

Further reading
 Women in Livy: Tullia Minor

1600s paintings
Cultural depictions of Tullia Minor
Cultural depictions of Servius Tullius